The 2019 European Athletics U20 Championships were the 25th edition of the biennial European U20 athletics championships. They were held in Borås, Sweden from 18 July to 21 July. Beginning with this edition the long-distance races for men were 3000 and 5000 metres instead of 5000 and 10,000 metres mirroring the women's programme.

Medal summary

Men

Track

* Medalists who participated in heats only.

Field

Combined

Women

Track

* Medalists who participated in heats only.

Field

Combined

Medal table

Participation
1,114 athletes from 48 nations are expected to participate in these championships.

References

External links

Results
Results book (archived)

European Athletics Junior Championships
International athletics competitions hosted by Sweden
European Athletics
European Athletics U20 Championships
European Athletics
European Athletics U20 Championships
Sports competitions in Borås